John Godwin (born March 10, 1877 in East Liverpool, Ohio; died May 5, 1956 in E. Liverpool, Ohio) nicknamed "Bunny", was a Major League Baseball player for the Boston Americans in 1905 and 1906.

Sources

1877 births
1956 deaths
Baseball players from Ohio
Boston Americans players
Major League Baseball third basemen
People from East Liverpool, Ohio
Bloomington Bloomers players
Seattle Siwashes players
Los Angeles Angels (minor league) players
Davenport Prodigals players
Quincy Infants players